Several ships of the Royal Navy have been named HMS Berkeley

 , a Hunt-class destroyer built in 1940 and destroyed during the Dieppe Raid in 1942
 , a  commissioned in 1986 and sold to Greece in 2001

See also
 

Royal Navy ship names